Pseudocreobotra wahlbergii, or the spiny flower mantis, is a small flower mantis  native to southern and eastern Africa.

Morphology
The adult has spiny structures on the underside of its abdomen, giving it its name. It is variable in colour, being typically light green, but it can equally be tinted yellow, pink, or red. It has a large eyespot on its forewings, which is black, green and cream and is surrounded by a green patch. The inner hind wings are orange and the outer hind wings are transparent. Nymphs are black until the third instar.

Sexual dimorphism 
P. wahlbergii exhibits sexual dimorphism. Females have small spines towards the base of their wings and six to seven segments on their abdomen. Females also tend to have slightly shorter antennae, longer wings, and take seven moults to reach maturity. On the other hand, males lack the spines found near females' wings, have eight abdominal segments, shorter wings, longer antennae and require six moults to reach maturity.

Behaviour and ecology
P. wahlbergii has a deimatic display in which it spreads its forewings, making itself appear larger and prominently displaying its eyespots to startle would-be predators. While at rest it is well camouflaged, and is a sufficiently good aggressive mimic of a flower that prey insects can attempt to pollinate it, at which moment the mantis seizes and eats them. They prefer to prey on flying insects and spiders, but if unavailable, will eat virtually any insect.

Spiny Flower mantises prefer flying insects throughout their entire lifecycle. These mantises have strong forearms, and a big appetite while they are growing up, and therefore can handle rather large prey compared to their body sizes. They will not chase after food though, as they are not a very active species. Instead, they prefer to remain completely still, disguised as part of the environment, waiting to strike when an unsuspecting insect comes by.

Like with many mantis species, P. wahlbergii females practice sexual cannibalism; however, nymphs are not cannibalistic until their fourth instar.

See also
 List of mantis genera and species
 Flower mantis

References

Hymenopodidae
Mantodea of Africa
Insects of Kenya
Insects described in 1871
Taxa named by Carl Stål